Mangaldan, officially the Municipality of Mangaldan, is a 1st class municipality in the province of Pangasinan, Philippines. According to the 2020 census, it has a population of 113,185 people.

History 
Mangaldan owns the distinction as the third town in Pangasinan to be founded by the Dominican missionaries. As early as 1591, Mangaldan already existed as a Spanish encomienda. Its foundation as a town is attributed to Blessed Juan Martinez de Santo Domingo, a former missionary of Pangasinan who died a martyr's death in Japan on 19 March 1618.

Mangaldan started as a "visita" of Calasiao and it remained as such until the Dominicans created it as an independent vicariate under the patronage of St. Thomas Aquinas on 2 June 1600.

It is said that of all the people of Pangasinan, the Mangaldanian were the most difficult to convert. The greatest enemy of the missionaries in the town was a certain man named Casipit who tried to force them out of the town and even attempted to kill some of them. Yet, when he was converted by the first apostle, Fr. Pedro Soto, he became the principal propagator of the Faith. He contributed a great sum of money for the construction of the first church.

In the second half of the 19th century, Mangaldan was the richest town in the province. This was due to the famous irrigation system which the missionaries built within the confines of the town causing its fertile fields to yield bountiful harvest of palay. Most outstanding in this gigantic task was Fr. Jose Torres who gave his life to bring it to completion in 1892.

The third church to be built in Mangaldan was completed in 1812 by Fr. Lorenzo Martin. It collapsed during the great earthquake of 16 March 1892, together with the big chapel in the cemetery. The construction of the convent dates back in 1747. The construction of the sixth and present church of Mangaldan was begun in 1942 by Fr. Juan Sison, and was completed 20 years later by Fr. Leon Bitanga.

During World War II, Mangaldan had an airstrip that was used by the American military.

Geography 
Mangaldan is located in the central part of Pangasinan. The Municipality is bordered by San Fabian on the north, Dagupan on the west, San Jacinto on the east and on the south, the municipalities of Mapandan and Santa Barbara.

Barangays
Mangaldan is politically subdivided into 30 barangays. These barangays are headed by elected officials: Barangay Captain, Barangay Council, whose members are called Barangay Councilors. All are elected every three years.

Climate

Rivers 
There are four rivers in Mangaldan: the Old Mangaldan River,  the Manguiragday River, the Angalacan River and the Paldakit River.

Demographics

Economy

Mangaldan celebrates its annual Pindang Festival along with its town fiesta during first week of March. The popular carabeef tapa (Filipino-style dried meat), locally known as Pindang is the One Town One Product (OTOP) of this municipality. The municipality is also the home of the original makers of the famous delicacy – the Romana Peanut Brittle.

The town bagged the grand slam award when its inland body of water, the Angalacan River, was adjudged as the cleanest river in the entire province for the third time which was awarded in 2012.

One of the major sources of revenues here are the thriving market place and the laboratories of renowned pharmaceutical companies that buttressed the coffer of this town. The municipal government operates its slaughterhouse with a rated "double A" by the National Meat Inspection Service (NMIS) that guarantees the butchered meat as safe and clean.

In 2015, the annual budget of Mangaldan involves a total appropriation of Php 208, 527, 497.39, which would be the biggest for a first class town in Pangasinan.

Government
Mangaldan, belonging to the fourth congressional district of the province of Pangasinan, is governed by a mayor designated as its local chief executive and by a municipal council as its legislative body in accordance with the Local Government Code. The mayor, vice mayor, and the councilors are elected directly by the people through an election which is being held every three years.

Elected officials

Education

Private Primary and Secondary schools
 Aura Vista Montessori and High School
 Cherished Moments School 
 Clarice Angels School
 Golden Angels Educational Institute
 Mangaldan Achievers Academy
 Mangaldan Technical Institute
 Metro-Dagupan Colleges
 Santo Tomas Catholic School
 The Right Formation School
 United Methodist Church Cinderella School

Public Primary schools
 Mangaldan Central School
 Amansabina Elementary School
 Anolid Elementary School
 Buenlag Elementary School
 David Elementary School
 Don Gregorio I. Magno Elementary School
 Embarcadero Elementary School
 Maasin Elementary School
 Macayug Elementary School
 Nibaliw Elementary School
 Salaan Elementary School
 Salay Elementary School
 Tebag Elementary School

Public Secondary schools
 David National High School
 Gueguesangen Integrated School
 Mangaldan Integrated School
 Mangaldan National High School

Gallery

References

External links

 
 Mangaldan Profile at PhilAtlas.com
 Municipal Profile at the National Competitiveness Council of the Philippines
 Mangaldan at the Pangasinan Government Website
 Local Governance Performance Management System
 [ Philippine Standard Geographic Code]
 Philippine Census Information

Municipalities of Pangasinan